The Yarowilca Province is the smallest of eleven provinces of the Huánuco Region in Peru.  The capital of this province is Chavinillo.

Boundaries
North: Dos de Mayo Province
East: Huánuco Province
South: Lauricocha Province
West: Dos de Mayo Province

Geography 
Other mountains are listed below:

Political division
The province is divided into eight districts, which are:

 Aparicio Pomares (Chupan)
 Cahuac (Cahuac)
 Chacabamba (Chacabamba)
 Chavinillo (Chavinillo)
 Choras (Choras)
 Jacas Chico (San Cristóbal de Jacas Chico)
 Obas (Obas)
 Pampamarca (Pampamarca)

Ethnic groups 
The people in the province are mainly indigenous citizens of Quechua descent. Quechua is the language which the majority of the population (60.97%) learnt to speak in childhood, 38.74% of the residents started speaking using the Spanish language (2007 Peru Census).

Archaeology 
Some of the most important archaeological sites of the province are Awkillu Waqra, T'akaq, Wallpayunka, Warahirka, Waruq and Wich'un.

Sources 

Provinces of the Huánuco Region